Vice-Admiral Henry Edgar Grace  (11 July 1876 – 19 March 1937) was a Royal Navy officer who served as Chief of the Submarine Service.

Naval career
The son of W. G. Grace, the famous cricketer, Grace was promoted to captain on 31 December 1914 and served in the First World War becoming commanding officer of the cruiser HMS Grafton in June 1915, of the cruiser HMS Yarmouth in August 1917, of the cruiser HMS Birkenhead in May 1918 and of the aircraft carrier HMS Vindictive in September 1918. He was mentioned in dispatches for valuable service during operations in the Gulf of Finland.

He was appointed Commodore-in-Charge, Hong Kong from June 1922 to October 1924. Grace went on to be Chief of the Submarine Service in September 1927.

He was promoted vice-admiral on 1 April 1930 and put on the Retired List the following day.

Family
Grace married Alice Catherine Slaughter; they had a son and three daughters.

References

1876 births
1937 deaths
Royal Navy vice admirals
Companions of the Order of the Bath
W. G. Grace
Henry
Military personnel from London